Raubling is a municipality  in the district of Rosenheim, in Bavaria, Germany. It is situated on the western bank of the river Inn, 7 km south of Rosenheim.

References

Rosenheim (district)
Populated places on the Inn (river)